Aleksei Viktorovich Ostayev (born 23 March 1973) is a former Russian football player.

He played two games as a goalkeeper for FC Gofrokarton Digora in 1996.

References

1973 births
Living people
Soviet footballers
Russian footballers
FC Spartak Vladikavkaz players
Russian Premier League players
Place of birth missing (living people)
Association football forwards
FC Spartak-UGP Anapa players